This is a list of the most notable people in Category:Alcohol-related deaths who died of short- and/or long-term effects of alcohol consumption. Deaths caused indirectly by alcohol, such as combined drug intoxication, or driving under the influence, are not listed here.

The Journal of the American Medical Association defines alcoholism as "a primary, chronic disease characterized by impaired control over drinking, preoccupation with the drug alcohol, use of alcohol despite adverse consequences, and distortions in thinking, most notably denial." The majority of people in this list died from causes brought on by alcoholism.

See also
 List of hazing deaths in the United States
 List of deaths from drug overdose and intoxication
 Lists of people by cause of death

Notes

Alcohol abuse
Alcohol
Alcohol-related lists